Ariel Magnus (born October 16, 1975 in Buenos Aires)) is an Argentine writer.  He studied Spanish literature and philosophy at the Friedrich Ebert Stiftung in Germany.

Selected works
 Sandra, Emecé Editores, Buenos Aires, 2005.
 La abuela, Planeta, 2006.
 Un chino en bicicleta, Norma, 2007.
 Muñecas, Emecé Editores, 2008
 Cartas a mi vecina de arriba, Norma, 2009

References

Argentine male writers
1975 births
Living people